Some Place Simple is the third studio album by British vocalist and songwriter Martina Topley-Bird. Recorded and mixed at Damon Albarn’s studio over a 3 week period in early 2010, the album consists of eleven stripped-down versions of previous songs, and four new ones composed for the record. The album was entirely performed by Martina, vocals, keyboard and ukulele, and Fergus Gerrand who toured with Martina as drummer, percussionist and guitarist with additional guitar by Claire Nicholson on Sandpaper Kisses. Composition contributions from Brian Burton, David Holmes, Chloe Paige, and Josh Klinghoffer.

Track listing

Personnel
Martina Topley Bird - vocals, guitar, keyboard
Fergus Gerrand - drums, percussion, guitar, kalimba
Claire Nicholson - guitar, background vocals
Jason Cox - engineering, mixing
Stephen Sedgwick - engineering, mixing

References

2010 albums
Martina Topley-Bird albums
Honest Jon's Records albums